Chaqa Deh (also Romanized as Chaqā Deh; also known as Cheqādeh and Chighadeh) is a village in Vandadeh Rural District, Meymeh District, Shahin Shahr and Meymeh County, Isfahan Province, Iran. At the 2006 census, its population was 10, in 5 families.

References 

Populated places in Shahin Shahr and Meymeh County